{{Infobox song|name=Not While I'm Around|artist=Helena Bonham CarterEdward Sanders|published=1979|writer=Stephen Sondheim|tracks=Sweeney Todd: The Demon Barber of Fleet Street: The Motion Picture Soundtrack}}
"Not While I'm Around" is a song from the Stephen Sondheim musical Sweeney Todd: The Demon Barber of Fleet Street. It is a duet between Tobias Ragg and Mrs. Lovett that first appeared on Broadway in 1979. A screen adaptation for the 2007 film of the same name features Edward Sanders as Tobias and Helena Bonham Carter as Mrs. Lovett.

Synopsis
In the pie shop that Mrs. Lovett owns, Mrs. Lovett's Meat Pie Emporium, she has taken in young Tobias Ragg, who was homeless, to be her helper. When Mrs. Lovett tells Tobias to run and get a piece of toffee, she inadvertently takes out a coin purse she stole from Tobias' old master, Adolfo Pirelli, who Sweeney Todd killed. Tobias expresses suspicions about Todd and states his desire to protect Mrs. Lovett, whom he has come to view as a mother figure. However, Mrs. Lovett tells him not to be afraid.

Critical reception
Scott Foundas of Variety described this song as "tender and haunting", noting that street urchin Tobias "becomes, for a moment, her surrogate son". Reviewing the 2007 film, Peter Travers of Rolling Stone wrote "[Helena] Bonham Carter evokes chills in 'Not While I'm Around,' a ballad of devotion she croons to her young apprentice, Toby, just before she arranges his demise". The scoresheet website JW Pepper wrote "This unforgettable ballad from Sweeney Todd will create a moment of tenderness in your concert". The New York Times'' wrote (of a regional stage production): "The contrast of lush ballads and menacing circumstances...occurs with 'Pretty Women,' sung by Sweeney and Judge Turpin, and 'Not While I’m Around,' sung protectively to Mrs. Lovett by her young aide, Tobias Ragg".

References

External links
Sweeney Todd Listing at sondheimguide.com

1979 songs
1970s ballads
Songs written by Stephen Sondheim
Songs from musicals
Sweeney Todd
Male–female vocal duets